is the ninth single from Aya Matsuura, who was a Hello! Project solo artist at the time. It was released on March 12, 2003 under the Zetima label. The Single V DVD was released on the same day.

Track listings

CD 
All lyrics are written by Tsunku.
  – 3:31
  – 3:50
 "Ne~e?" (Instrumental) – 3:28

DVD 
 "Ne~e?"
 "Ne~e?"(Dance Shot Ver.)

External links 
 Ne~e? entries on the Up-Front Works official website: CD, DVD

Aya Matsuura songs
Zetima Records singles
2003 singles
Shibuya-kei songs
Japanese-language songs
Songs written by Tsunku
Song recordings produced by Tsunku